2-Naphthoic acid is an organic compound of the formula C10H7CO2H.  It is one of two isomeric carboxylic acid derivatives of naphthalene, the other one being 1-naphthoic acid.   It can be prepared by carboxylation of 1-chloronaphthalene.
 Its pKa is 4.2.

References

2-Naphthyl compounds
Carboxylic acids